Elena Igorevna Proklova (born 2 September 1953 in Moscow, Russia) is a Soviet and Russian actress. Honored Artist of RSFSR.
In 2021, the actress spoke about harassment at work. When she was 12 years old and working in a film, she was molested by the second director of the film. When she was 15 years old and she worked on the set of a film, a famous actor molested her and forced her to sleep with him and this lasted 2 years. And after her marriage to the director, the famous actor got angry, beat her and began spread unpleasant gossip about her to people.

Selected filmography
 They're Calling, Open the Door  (1965) as Tanya Nechaeva
 The Snow Queen (Снежная королева, 1966) as Gerda
 Transitional Age (Переходный возраст, 1968) as Olga Alekseyeva
 Shine, Shine, My Star (Гори, гори, моя звезда, 1970) as Christina Kotlyarenko
 Mimino (Мимино, 1977) as Larisa Ivanovna Komarova
 The Dog in the Manger (Собака на сене, 1978) as Marcela
 Be my husband (Будьте моим мужем, 1982) as Natasha Kostikova

References

External links

1953 births
Living people
Russian film actresses
Russian television actresses
Soviet film actresses
Soviet television actresses
Members of the Civic Chamber of the Russian Federation
Soviet child actresses
Russian television presenters
United Russia politicians
21st-century Russian politicians
Honored Artists of the RSFSR
Actresses from Moscow
Recipients of the Lenin Komsomol Prize
Russian women television presenters
Moscow Art Theatre School alumni
20th-century Russian women